Anastasia [Nastia] Stanko is a Ukrainian journalist and television hostess, a member of the "Stop censorship" movement.

Biography
Born in Nyzhniv, Tlumach Raion, Ivano-Frankivsk Oblast and after graduating the Lviv University, Stanko worked as journalist for the Pershyi and TVi. In 2013 she became one of the founders of Hromadske TV where she currently works.

On June 14, 2014 at around 12:30 pm she was detained for four hours by the Russian Border Troops when she accidentally crossed the Russia–Ukraine border in the settlement of Milove, Luhansk Oblast (Ukraine). After her detention, Stanko was handed over to the Ukrainian authorities with the request to pay a fine of 3,000 rubles and delete any photo and video materials. On June 16, 2014 "Stop censorship" organized a press-conference in Kharkiv to which was invited Anastasia Stanko to share her experience. In her interview to ATN television broadcasting company she stated that there wasn't any border identification between Ukraine and Russia.

On June 30, 2014 Anastasia Stanko along with Illya Bezkorovainy near Stanytsia Luhanska were taken hostage by the Luhansk People's Republic, while performing their professional duties. They were placed in a basement of one of building in the center of Luhansk city. While being kidnapped Stanko absolutely refused to give any interview to Russian journalists, particularly from LifeNews. On July 2, 2014 she was supposedly released from kidnapping.

In her interview to Podrobnosti on July 6, 2014 Stanko claimed that she was kept by same people who were keeping Nadiya Savchenko.

References

Living people
1986 births
People from Ivano-Frankivsk Oblast
University of Lviv alumni
Ukrainian journalists
Ukrainian women journalists
Ukrainian television presenters
Ukrainian women television presenters
Ukrainian prisoners and detainees
Prisoners and detainees of Russia
People of the Euromaidan
Hromadske.TV people
TVi (TV channel) people
UA:First people